The 1989 NCAA Women's Gymnastics championship involved 12 schools competing for the national championship of women's NCAA Division I gymnastics.  It was the eighth NCAA gymnastics national championship and the defending NCAA Team Champion for 1988 was Alabama.  The competition took place in Athens, Georgia hosted by the University of Georgia in the Georgia Coliseum. The 1989 Championship was won by host Georgia, their second title, with a record score of 192.650.

While Suzanne Yoculan and the Georgia Gym Dogs hosted, the favorite heading into nationals was Tanya Service and the UCLA Bruins with the #1 seed.  Juggernaut #2 seed, Utah came in with the addition of 1988 American Olympian, Missy Marlowe. The defending champion, Alabama, lost their top gymnast, Marie Robbins, to an ankle injury before the finals.

At the end of the competition, UCLA head coach Jerry Tomlinson filed an inquiry over several scores with the judges.  After the judges review, UCLA still fell short five one-hundredths of a point.

Team Results

External links
  Gym Results

NCAA Women's Gymnastics championship
NCAA Women's Gymnastics Championship